Brighton Township is one of the eighteen townships of Lorain County, Ohio, United States. As of the 2010 census, the population was 915.

Geography
Located in southwestern Lorain County, it borders the following townships:
Camden Township - north
Pittsfield Township - northeast corner
Wellington Township - east
Huntington Township - southeast corner
Rochester Township - south
New London Township, Huron County - southwest corner
Clarksfield Township, Huron County - west

No municipalities are located in Brighton Township.

Name and history
It is the only Brighton Township statewide, named after the city of Brighton in England.

Government
The township is governed by a three-member board of trustees, who are elected in November of odd-numbered years to a four-year term beginning on the following January 1. Two are elected in the year after the presidential election and one is elected in the year before it. There is also an elected township fiscal officer, who serves a four-year term beginning on April 1 of the year after the election, which is held in November of the year before the presidential election. Vacancies in the fiscal officership or on the board of trustees are filled by the remaining trustees.

References

External links

County website

Townships in Lorain County, Ohio
Townships in Ohio